The 7th Street Theatre is a theatre in downtown Hoquiam, Washington. It is one of the few remaining examples of an atmospheric theatre that remain in the United States. The not-for-profit 7th Street Theatre Association runs the theatre and coordinates a series of live shows, second-run feature films. The group aims to restore the Theatre as close to original as possible.

The theatre was built in 1928 by Olaf T. Taylor, and was designed by Edwin St. John Griffith as a Spanish atmospheric theatre. There are murals on the ceiling in the lobby, along with a fountain. The fountain is not currently in use. Additionally, the auditorium features twinkling lights in the ceiling, and a recently installed sound system. The rigging was replaced in 2008. The seats were restored by McNeil Island Correctional Institute. The ceiling was repaired in 2009. As of 2018, the current board is raising funds to repair the back wall.

On March 20, 2008, volunteer staff unloaded a truck delivering the Theatre's original organ. By 1944 theatre organs had fallen out of fashion, and the organ was sold to Parkland's Trinity Lutheran Church by Balcom & Vaughan. Records indicate that three additional ranks were added at this time bringing the instrument up to a 2/7 (minus the toy counter and percussions). In 1960, the instrument was purchased by George Martin of Tacoma. Mr. Martin studied organ with Martha Green and Arnold Leverenz in the Seattle/Tacoma area between 1951 and 1953. He eventually moved the organ to his home in Clute, TX. It was purchased by a donation primarily from Tom Quigg and Pat Oleachea, and moved by truck back to the 7th Street Theatre. Estimates put the organ installation as complete as early as 2012, at a cost of approximately $12,000.

The 7th Street was placed on the National Register of Historic Places in 1987.  The 7th Street Theatre was the first building in Hoquiam on the city's historic register in 2008.

References

External links

Official website
Cinema Treasures listing
Puget Sound Theatre Organ Society website - 9 photos (1920's to present)
City-data.com website - 1 current photo

National Register of Historic Places in Grays Harbor County, Washington
Theatres on the National Register of Historic Places in Washington (state)
Theatres completed in 1928
Buildings and structures in Grays Harbor County, Washington
Tourist attractions in Grays Harbor County, Washington
Atmospheric theatres
1928 establishments in Washington (state)